Marie-Curie (known as Technoparc during development) is an under-construction underground Réseau express métropolitain (REM) station in the borough of Saint-Laurent in Montreal, Quebec, Canada. Scheduled to open in 2027, it is planned to be operated by CDPQ Infra and to serve the Airport branch of the REM.

It will serve Technoparc Montreal, Canada's first technology and science park, near Montréal–Trudeau International Airport.

References

Railway stations in Montreal
Réseau express métropolitain railway stations
Saint-Laurent, Quebec
Railway stations scheduled to open in 2025